Azongha Tembeng Abenego (born 13 September 1991) is a Cameroonian footballer.

International career
In 2011, Tembeng was part of Cameroon's squad that won the bronze medal at the 2011 All-Africa Games.

Honours

Club
 ES Sétif
 Algerian Ligue Professionnelle 1 (1): 2016-17

References

External links
 
 

1991 births
Living people
Algerian Ligue Professionnelle 1 players
Cameroonian footballers
Les Astres players
Cameroonian expatriate footballers
DRB Tadjenanet players
Expatriate footballers in Algeria
Cameroonian expatriate sportspeople in Algeria
ES Sétif players
C.D. Tondela players
G.D. Estoril Praia players
Varzim S.C. players
MC El Eulma players
Primeira Liga players
Liga Portugal 2 players
Expatriate footballers in Portugal
Cameroonian expatriate sportspeople in Portugal
Association football midfielders
African Games medalists in football
African Games bronze medalists for Cameroon
Competitors at the 2011 All-Africa Games